Frederick McNair may refer to:

 Frederick V. McNair (1839–1900), Rear Admiral in the United States Navy, veteran of the American Civil War
 Frederick V. McNair Jr. (1882–1962), Captain in the United States Navy, awarded the Medal of Honor
 Frederick V. McNair, IV, known as Fred McNair (born 1950), champion tennis player
 Fred McNair (gridiron football) (born 1968), American football player and coach